National Institute of Technology Jamshedpur (NIT Jamshedpur or NITJSR), is an Institute of National Importance for Technical Education located at Jamshedpur, Jharkhand, India. Established as a Regional Institute of Technology on 15 August  1960, it was upgraded to National Institute of Technology (NIT) on 27 December 2002 with the status of a Deemed University. It is one of the 31 NITs in India, and as such is directly under the control of the Ministry of Education (MHRD). It is the third in the chain of 8 NITs established as a part of the Second Five Year Plan (1956–61) by the Government of India.

History

National Institute of Technology, Jamshedpur was founded as the Regional Institute of Technology in 1960 by Dr. Srikrishna Sinha, the then Chief Minister of the state of Bihar (unpartitioned). The date of 15 August, Independence Day in India, was chosen for the laying of the foundation stone. It was among the first eight Regional Engineering Colleges (RECs) established as part of the Second Five-Year Plan (1956–1961). It now serves as the NIT for the newly carved state of Jharkhand, while NIT Patna serves as the NIT for the state of Bihar.

Academics and admission
The institute offers a Ph.D in various streams and twelve semester courses various disciplines. It offers admission in its undergraduates courses of BTech through JEE-Main Entrance Examination, which is the pre-requisite for admission in all NITs.

Ranking 

NIT Jamshedpur was ranked 79 among engineering colleges in India by the National Institutional Ranking Framework (NIRF) in 2020. Its rank slipped down to 86 in the 2021 NIRF ranking. It slipped further down to 90 in 2022.https://www.nirfindia.org/2022/EngineeringRanking.html

Festivals
There are three annual festivals:
Ojass, a techno-management festival of the college to showcase the technical and managerial skill of the students.
Urja, annual athletics sports meet.
 Culfest, a cultural festival.
 Technica, an annual festival for students of Metallurgical and Materials engineering from all over India
 Vidhaan, a civil branch festival managed by Civil Engineering Society of NIT Jamshedpur.
 NIT Jamshedpur Conference Catalysis and Photocatalysis for Clean Energy (CPCE)

Notable alumni
Malli Mastan Babu - fastest 7 summiteer in the world
Kul Man Ghising - former managing director of Nepal Electricity Authority(NEA) known for ending load-shedding
Ram Vinay Shahi - Chairman of Energy Infratech Private Limited. Former Chairman and Managing Director of Bombay Suburban Electric Supply Limited. Former Secretary to GOI in the ministry of power.

See also
 National Institute of Technology, Rourkela
 National Institute of Technology, Bhopal
 National Institute of Technology, Durgapur
 National Institutes of Technology
 Institute Of National Importance

References

External links

 
 Official Team Phoenix website

 
Education in Jharkhand
Engineering colleges in Jharkhand
National Institutes of Technology
Educational institutions established in 1960
Education in Jamshedpur
1960 establishments in Bihar
Universities and colleges in Jharkhand
All India Council for Technical Education